Patanadevi is a historic and tourist place situated 18 km to the southwest from Chalisgaon, Maharashtra.  This place is inside Gautala Autramghat Sanctuary and surrounded of high mountains of Sahyadri.

It consists of Chandika Devi Temple and Hemadpanthi Mahadev Temple.

History 
In earlier days, this was a capital of an important Province called Patna (Vijjalgad) consitance. It was ruled by the former monarch at the state of the Yadav kings and their tributary. This capital city was 4–5 miles in length and width of the city at the time. City was surrounded by high mountain like walls and it was very beautiful because of the surrounding forest. In the surrounding forest there were different kind of fruit trees, and besides a highway. Water was supplied to the city by digging water tanks on the high part of the mountain. The city has been famous for trade, art, learning, traffic and temples since the Shalivahan Saka period due to its metal mines and various vegetation on 
the hills. At that time, the Mandlik kings of Yadav built Siddheshwar Temple at Waghli (Year 991), Shardadevi Temple at Bahal (Year 1144) and Chandika Devi Temple at Patna (Year 1128).

Bhaskaracharya 

Bhaskaracharya or Bhaskara II was a 12th century Indian Mathematician. He was also a renowned astronomer of that time. He lived in the a Aashram in Patnadevi. He is said to have written his famous magnum opus, Siddhanta Shiromani in Patnadevi.

Importance and status 
The Chadika Mata of Patnadevi is the Kul-Devta of many Hindu castes and tribes. Even today, in the Kuladharma Kulachara (A ritual), many devotees carry rice for puja in remembrance of Bhagwati from Dhawaltirtha.

References

 http://www.patnadevi.com/
 https://web.archive.org/web/20140908085927/http://jalgaon.nic.in/html/Tourist_Information.htm

Tourist attractions in Jalgaon district
Devi temples in India